Blood Ritual is the second album by the Swiss heavy metal band Samael, released in 1992 on the Century Media Records label.

Background and recording
When Samael's one-album-only contract with Osmose Productions expired the group signed with Century Media which, in the words of vocalist/guitarist Vorphalack, offered them a "rather interesting" deal. The long time between Worship Him and Blood Ritual, explains Vorphalack, was due to negotiations between them and the label. The band chose to record their new record in Germany rather than Switzerland due to the expensive studio time of their native country.

Music
Vorphalack argued that the main change between Worship Him and Blood Ritual was the record production and not the music. According to him there are songs in their sophomore album that pre-date their debut.

Track listing
 "Epilogue" – 0:40
 "Beyond the Nothingness" – 4:31
 "Poison Infiltration" – 3:58
 "After the Sepulture" – 4:35
 "Macabre Operetta" – 6:41
 "Blood Ritual" – 3:25
 "Since the Creation..." – 0:34
 "With the Gleam of the Torches" – 6:25
 "Total Consecration" – 2:40
 "Bestial Devotion" – 4:50
 "...Until the Chaos" – 3:25

Personnel
Vorphalack - Vocals, Guitars
Masmiseim - Bass
Xytraguptor - Keyboards, Drums, Percussion

References

Bibliography

 Löns, S. (1993). Samael. Witchraft, 1: 7-9.

1992 albums
Samael (band) albums
Century Media Records albums
Albums produced by Waldemar Sorychta